Chapman is an English surname derived from the Old English occupational name céapmann "marketman, monger, merchant", from the verb céapan, cypan "to buy or sell" and the noun form ceap "barter, business, purchase." Alternate spellings include Caepmon, Cepeman, Chepmon, Cypman(n), and Shapman. (By 1600, the occupational name chapman had come to be applied to an itinerant dealer in particular, but it remained in use for both "customer, buyer" and "merchant" in the 17th and 18th centuries. Modern chiefly British slang chap “man" arose from the use of the abbreviated word to mean a customer, one with whom to bargain.)

The Oxford English Dictionary (OED) supplies four meanings for chapman, all of which pertain to buying and selling: 1) A man whose business was buying and selling; 2) an itinerant dealer who travels, also known as a hawker or peddler; 3) an agent in a commercial transaction; 4) a purchaser or customer. (N.B. A “petty chapman” was a retail dealer.) The OED includes a citation of an English ordinance or decree that dates from 1553, during the reign of Edward VI: "No Tinker, Peddler, or petit Chapman shall wander about from the Towne but such as shall be licensed by two Justices of Peace." According to a list of colonial occupations, a chapman is a peddler or dealer of goods, usually itinerant, going from village to village. The related word chapbook is a later coinage from the 19th century which appears to refer to the fact that chapbooks were very cheaply made. From Old English ceap is also derived cheap “inexpensive,” a shortening of good ceap “good buy,” and Cheapside “market place,” a street in London that both historically and in modern times has been the financial center of the city.

Both the compound “chapman” and its first element chap- have cognates in all the major Germanic languages: From the prehistoric West Germanic compound *kaup- are derived cognates Old Saxon cop, Old Frisian kap "trade, purchase," Middle Dutch coop, modern Dutch kopen “ to buy,” koop "trade, market, bargain and goedkoop “inexpensive." These are akin to Old High German choufman, German Kaufmann, a common modern German surname; and North Germanic forms leading to Old Norse kaup "bargain, pay,” modern Swedish köpa “buy,” and modern Danish kjøb "purchase, bargain" and Copenhagen (originally Køpmannæhafn "merchants' harbor, buyer's haven"). The common ancestor is Proto-Germanic *kaupoz-, which was probably an ancient Germanic borrowing of Latin caupo, caupon- "petty tradesman, huckster," of unknown ulterior etymology. From the German the word was borrowed into the Slavic languages (Old Slavic koupiti, modern Russian купить, etc.), the Baltic languages (Old Prussian kaupiskan “trade, commerce,” Lithuanian kὑpczus “merchant”) and Finnish kaupata “to sell cheaply.” In the Romance languages, however, the word has not survived.

People with the surname or nickname Chapman include:

A

Abel Chapman (1851–1929), British born hunter-naturalist
Adam Chapman (born 1989), Northern Irish footballer
Alfred Chapman (1829–1915), American real estate attorney and investor, best known as one of the founders of Orange, California
Alger Chapman (1904–1983), American attorney, businessman and New York State official
Alger Chapman Jr. (1931–2013), American chief executive
Allan Chapman (historian) (born 1946), British historian of science
Allan Chapman (politician) (1897–1966), Scottish Unionist Member of Parliament 1935–1945
Alvah Chapman Jr. (1921–2008), American newspaper publisher
Alvan Wentworth Chapman, American botanist
Amy Chapman (born 1987), Australian soccer player
Andrew Grant Chapman (1839–1892), American politician
Andy Chapman (born 1959), British indoor soccer player
Anna Kushchyenko-Chapman (born 1982), Russian entrepreneur, television host, and agent of the Russian Federation
Anne Chapman, Franco-American ethnologist
Annie Chapman (1841–1888), English victim of Jack the Ripper
Aroldis Chapman (born 1988), Cuban baseball player
Art Chapman, (1906–1962), Canadian Ice Hockey player and Olympian
Art Chapman (basketball) (1912–1986), Canadian basketball player
Arthur Chapman (poet) (1873–1935), American poet and newspaper columnist
Arthur B. Chapman (1908–2004), British-American animal genetic researcher
Augustus A. Chapman (1805–1876), American lawyer and Democratic Party politician
Augustus Chapman Allen (1806–1864), American founder of Houston, Texas
Austin Chapman (1864–1926), Australian Protectionist Party politician

B
Ben Chapman (politician) (born 1940), British Labour Party politician and former civil servant
Ben Chapman (actor) (1928–2008), American actor, best known for playing the Gill-man in the 1954 movie Creature from the Black Lagoon
Ben Chapman (baseball) (1908–1993), American baseball player
Ben Chapman (footballer, born 1979), English football player
Benjamin Chapman (1621–unknown), English soldier
Bert Chapman (born 1942), Australian footballer
 Beth Chapman (bounty hunter), American bounty hunter and reality star
 Beth Chapman (politician), American politician from Alabama
Beth Nielsen Chapman (born 1958), American singer and songwriter
Billy Chapman (1902–1967), English footballer
Bird Beers Chapman (1821–1871), American editor and Democratic Party politician
Bob Chapman (born 1946), English footballer, often known as 'Sammy'
Brenda Chapman, American animator and film director
Brian Chapman (born 1968), Canadian ice hockey player
Brian Chapman (businessman), British businessman
Bruce Chapman (born 1934), American director and founder of the Discovery Institute, and Republican Party politician
Bruce Chapman (Australian economist), architect of the Higher Education Contribution Scheme in Australia.

C

Candace Chapman (born 1983), Canadian soccer player
Carrie Chapman Catt (1859–1947), American woman's suffrage leader
C.C. Chapman, American prominent figure in the community of podcasting, podsafe music, and new media
C. H. Chapman (1879–1972), British illustrator and cartoonist, notable for his work on Billy Bunter cartoon strips
Charles Chapman (disambiguation), several people
Charles Chapman Grafton (1830–1912), American Bishop of the Diocese of Fond du Lac in The Episcopal Church
Chris Chapman (rugby league), English rugby league footballer who played in the 1990s and 2000s
Chris Chapman (rugby league, born 1966), rugby league footballer who played in the 1980s and 1990sCharles Chapman (disambiguation)
Christine Chapman (born 1956), Welsh Labour Party politician
Christopher Chapman (1927–2015), Canadian filmmaker
Chuck Chapman (1911–2002), Canadian basketball player and olympian
Clarence Chapman (born 1953), American football player
Colin Chapman (1928–1982), British automotive engineer, designer, and racing director
Cornelius Chapman, British poet, songwriter, author, and performer

D

Damien Chapman, British rugby league player
Dave Chapman (actor) (born 1973), British actor, television presenter, puppeteer and voice artist
David Chapman (journalist) (born 1976), American journalist
David Chapman (chemist) (1869–1958), English physical chemist
David Chapman (cricketer) (1855–1934), English cricketer
David Chapman (handballer), American handballer
Dean Roden Chapman (1922–1995), American mechanical engineer at NASA and Stanford University
Dick Chapman (1911–1978), American amateur golfer
Dinos Chapman, (born 1962), English conceptual artist
Donald Chapman, Baron Northfield (1923–2013), British Labour Party politician and life peer
Donovan Chapman, American country music artist
Doug Chapman (stuntman), American stunt performer, actor and stunt coordinator
Doug Chapman (American football) (born 1977), American football player
Duane Chapman (born 1953), American Hawaii-based bail bondsman and bounty hunter

E

Ed Chapman (artist), British artist
Eddie Chapman (1914–1997), British spy and double agent, aka Agent Zigzag
Eddie Chapman (footballer) (1923–2002), English footballer and chairman
Edgar Chapman (1838–1909), brewer and businessman, owner of Theatre Royal, Adelaide
Edmund Chapman (1695–1763), English cricketer
Edward Chapman (actor) (1901–1977), British comic actor
Edward Chapman (British Army officer) (1840-1926), British Army officer
Edward Chapman (politician) (1839–1906), British Conservative Party politician
Edward Thomas Chapman (1920–2002), Welsh corporal and recipient of the Victoria Cross
Edythe Chapman (1863–1948), American stage and silent film actress
Elizabeth Chapman, Children's author
Emmett Chapman, British jazz musician best known as the inventor of the musical instrument Chapman Stick
Ernest Chapman (1926–2013), Australian rower
Eugenia S. Chapman (1923–1994), American educator and politician

F

Fern Schumer Chapman, American author
Frank Chapman (ornithologist) (1864–1945), American ornithologist
Frank Chapman (baseball) (1861–1937), American baseball player once (incorrectly) thought to be the youngest player in professional history
Frank Chapman (businessman), Chief Executive of BG Group
Fred Chapman (baseball) (1916–1997), American baseball player
Freddie Spencer Chapman (1907–1971), British Army officer and World War II veteran
Frederick Chapman (palaeontologist) (1864–1943), Australia Commonwealth Palaeontologist
Frederick Chapman (footballer) (1883–1951), English footballer and Olympic Gold medalist
Frederick Chapman (sportsman) (1901–1964), Australian cricketer and Australian Rules footballer
Frederick Chapman (judge) (1849–1936), New Zealand Supreme Court Judge
Frederick Chapman Robbins (1916–2003), American pediatrician and virologist
Fredrik Henrik af Chapman (1721–1808), Swedish naval ship architect

G

Gareth Chapman (born 1981), Welsh rugby union player
Gary Chapman (author), American relationship counselor and author of The Five Love Languages series
Gary Chapman (swimmer) (1937–1978), Australian swimmer and Olympic bronze medalist
Gary Chapman (musician) (born 1957), American singer/songwriter and former television talk show host
George Chapman (1559–1634), English dramatist, translator, and poet
George Chapman (murderer) (1865–1903), Polish serial killer, suspected by some as being Jack the Ripper. Born Seweryn Antonowicz Kłosowski
George Chapman (healer) (1921–2006), British trance healer and medium
George Henry Chapman (1832–1882), American Civil War General in the Union Army
George W. Chapman (politician), American lawyer and Democratic Party politician
Georgina Chapman (born 1976), British fashion designer and actress
Gerald Chapman (1891–1926), American criminal and gang leader of the Prohibition-era
Gerald Chapman (director) (1949–1987), British theatre director
Glenn Chapman (1906–1988), American baseball player
Graham Chapman (1941–1989), British comedian and writer, member of Monty Python
Grant Chapman (born 1949), Australian Liberal Party politician
Grizz Chapman, American television actor, notable appearances in 30 Rock
Guy Chapman (1889–1972), British author, historian and distinguished World War II soldier

H

 Hank Chapman, American golden age comic book writer
 Harold Chapman (born 1927), English photographer, especially noted for pictures taken at the Beat Hotel
 Harold Chapman (footballer), New Zealand International footballer
 Harold Chapman (orthodontist) (1881–1965), England's first exclusive orthodontic practitioner
 Harry Chapman (footballer, born 1880) (1879–1916), English footballer
 Harry Chapman (footballer, born 1997)
 Harry Chapman (news anchor), American television news anchor
 H. E. Chapman (1871–1944), British soldier and police officer
 Harry Chapman Pincher (born 1914), Indian-born British journalist and novelist
 Hayley Chapman, Australian television presenter and producer
 Henry Chapman (American politician) (1804–1891), American Democratic Party politician
 Henry Samuel Chapman (1803–1881), British-born Australian and New Zealand judge
 Henry Chapman Mercer (1856–1930), American archeologist, artifact collector, tile maker and designer
 Herbert Chapman (1878–1934), English football player and manager, notably of Huddersfield Town and Arsenal
 Hope Chapman (born 1990), American anime critic, best known for work with That Guy with the Glasses and Anime News Network
 Horace Chapman (disambiguation)
 Hugh Chapman (1853-1933), British Anglican priest and liberal politician

I
Ian Chapman (born 1970), English footballer
Isaac C. Bates (1779–1845), American politician
Ivan Chapman (1906–1976), English cricketer

J

Jake Chapman (born 1966), English conceptual artist
Jake Chapman (politician), member of the Iowa Senate
James Chapman (author) (born 1955), American novelist and publisher
James Chapman (explorer) (1831–1872), South African explorer, hunter, trader and photographer
James Chapman (bishop) (died 1879), first Bishop of Colombo (Anglican) in Sri Lanka
James A. Chapman (1881–1966), American businessman and philanthropist
James Chapman-Taylor (1878–1958), New Zealand domestic architect
Jan Chapman (born 1950), Australian film producer
Jane Chapman, British academic
Janice Chapman, Australian-born British singer and voice coach
Jay Chapman (physician) (fl.1977), American physician and forensic pathologist
Jay Chapman (soccer) (born 1994), Canadian soccer midfielder
J. B. Chapman (1884–1947), American minister and president of Arkansas Holiness and Peniel Colleges
Jeff Chapman (1973–2005); Canadian urban-explorer, fountaineer, author and editor. Also known as Ninjalicious
Jeff Chapman (politician), American politician
Jenny Chapman (born 1973), British Labour politician
Jessica Chapman (1991–2002), murder victim of Ian Huntley
Jim Chapman (disambiguation), several people
Johnny Appleseed or John Chapman (1774–1847), American pioneer orchardist and Swedenborgian Christian missionary
John Chapman (artist) (born 1946), British artist
John Chapman (screenwriter), (1927–2010), English playwright, screenwriter and scriptwriter
John Chapman (football manager), English manager of Manchester United football team
John Chapman (Pennsylvania politician) (1740–1800), American Federalist Party politician
John Chapman (priest) (1865–1933), British Roman Catholic priest
John Chapman (publisher) (1821–1894), British publisher and physician
John A. Chapman USAF MSgt, Combat Controller, posthumously awarded Medal of Honor
John David "J.D." Chapman (born 1983), American heavyweight boxer
John Gadsby Chapman (1808–1889), American artist
John Grant Chapman (1798–1856), American Whig Party politician
John Herbert Chapman (1921–1979), Canadian space researcher from London, Ontario
John Jay Chapman (1862–1933), American author and essayist
John Wilbur Chapman (1859–1918), American Presbyterian evangelist
Johnny Chapman (born 1967), American race car driver in the NASCAR Nationwide series
Jonathan Chapman (1807–1848), American politician and mayor of Boston
Jonathan Chapman (academic) (born 1975), British academic, consultant and writer
Joseph Chapman (actor), American film and television actor
Joseph A. Chapman, American President of North Dakota State University
Joseph John Chapman (1784–1849), California pioneer
Judith Chapman (born 1945), American actress

K
Katie Chapman (born 1982), English football player
Karen Chapman, English retired badminton player
Keith Chapman (born 1958), British children's author and creator of Bob the Builder
Keith Chapman (organist) (1945–1989), American organist
Kelvin Chapman (born 1956), American baseball player
Kevin Chapman, American actor
Kory Chapman (born 1980), American football player
Kyle Chapman (New Zealand activist) (born 1971), New Zealand director of the NZNF (New Zealand National Front)
Kyle Chapman (activist) (born 1975 or 1976), nicknamed "Based Stickman", American alt-right activist

L

Lamar Chapman (born 1976), American football player
Lanei Chapman (born 1973), American actress
Lee Chapman (born 1959), English football player
Leigh M. Chapman (born 1984), American voting rights activist and politician 
Leland Chapman (born 1976), American Hawaii-based bail bondsman and bounty hunter
Leonard F. Chapman Jr. (1913–2000), American Commandant of the U.S. Marine Corps
Les Chapman (born 1948), English football player and manager
Lloyd Chapman (born 1949), American founder of the American Small Business League
Lonny Chapman (1920–2007), American television actor
Luke Chapman (born 1991), English footballer
Lyssa Chapman (born 1987), American bounty hunter

M

 Marco Allen Chapman (1971–2008), American murderer executed in Kentucky
 Margaret Chapman (1940–2000), British illustrator and painter
 Marguerite Chapman (1918–1999), American actress
 Maria Weston Chapman (1806–1885), American abolitionist
 Mariana Wright Chapman (1843–1907), American social reformer, suffragist
 Mark Chapman (broadcaster) (born 1973), British radio sports newsreader and DJ
 Mark David Chapman (born 1955), American assassin of former Beatle John Lennon
 Mark Lindsay Chapman (born 1954), English film and television actor
 Marshall Chapman (born 1949), American country rock singer-songwriter
 Mary Chapman, British Chief Executive of the Chartered Management Institute
 Matt Chapman (The Brothers Chaps), duo responsible for the creation of the Homestar Runner series of animated cartoons
 Matt Chapman, Professional baseball player for the Toronto Blue Jays
 Matthew Chapman (author) (born 1950), British journalist, screenwriter and director; also great-great grandson of Charles Darwin
 Meyrick Chapman, English Olympian
 Michael Chapman (disambiguation), several people
 Michelle Chapman (known as Tori Black, born 1988), American pornographic actress
 Mike Chapman, Australian record producer and songwriter
 Mike Chapman (The Brothers Chaps), duo responsible for the creation of the Homestar Runner series of animated cartoons
 Minerva J. Chapman (1858–1947), American painter
 Mitchell Chapman (born 1983), Australian Rugby Union player

N

Nathan Chapman (soldier) (died 2002), American soldier, was the first American killed during the invasion of Afghanistan
Nathan Chapman (footballer) (born 1975), Australian footballer and American Football player
Nathaniel Chapman (1780–1853), American physician and founder of the American Journal of the Medical Sciences
Nicki Chapman (born 1967), British television presenter
Nicky Chapman, Baroness Chapman (born 1961), British peer
Nigel Chapman (mayor), British Civic Mayor of Colchester
Nigel Chapman (cricketer) (born 1945), English cricketer

O
Orlow W. Chapman (1832–1890), American Solicitor General of the United States
Oscar L. Chapman (1896–1978), American Secretary of the Interior during the last three years of the Truman administration
Owl Chapman, Surfer

P

Pat Chapman, founder of The Curry Club, and author
Patsy Chapman (born 1948), British newspaper editor
Patrick Chapman, Irish writer and poet
Paul Chapman (Australian footballer), Australian Rules footballer
Paul Chapman (musician), Welsh rock guitarist (UFO, Skid Row)
Paul Chapman (actor), British television actor
Penny Chapman, Australian television producer
Percy Chapman (1900–1961), English cricketer
Percy Chapman Black (1878–1961), Canadian Progressive Conservative Party politician
Philip K. Chapman (1935–2021), Australian-born American astronaut and scientist

R

Ray Chapman (1891–1920), American shortstop for the Cleveland baseball team
Reginald Frederick Chapman (1930–2003), English-American entomologist
Reuben Chapman (1799–1882), American lawyer and politician
Rex Chapman (born 1967), American retired professional basketball player
Richard Chapman (disambiguation)
Robert Chapman (cricketer) (born 1972), English first-class cricketer in the 1990s
Robert Chapman (pastor) (1803–1902), English pastor, teacher and evangelist
Sir Robert Chapman, 1st Baronet (1880–1963), British soldier and Conservative Member of Parliament 1931–1935
Robert F. Chapman (born 1926), American U.S. court of appeals judge
Robert Hett Chapman (1771–1833), American, president of the University of North Carolina
Robert L. Chapman (1920–2002), American lexicographer
Robert William Chapman (scholar)
Robin Chapman (born 1933), British actor and writer
Roger Chapman (born 1942), British rock singer
Roger Chapman (golfer) (born 1959), English golfer
Roger Chapman (submariner) (born 1945), submariner rescued from sunken submersible Pisces III in 1973
Ronald Ivelaw-Chapman (1899–1978), British senior commander in the Royal Air Force, and Commander-in-Chief of the Royal Indian Air Force
Roosevelt Chapman, American college basketball player and University of Dayton Hall of Famer
Roy Chapman (1934–1983), English football player and manager
Roy H. Chapman (1883–1952), Justice of the Florida Supreme Court
Roy Chapman Andrews (1864–1960), American explorer, adventurer, naturalist and director of the American Museum of Natural History
Royal Norton Chapman (1889–1939), American entomologist and ecologist
Ryan Chapman (born 1987), South African soccer player

S

Sam Chapman (1916–2006), American college football player and professional baseball player
Sammy Chapman (1938–2019), Northern Irish footballer and football manager
Samuel Chapman (British politician) (1859–1947), Scottish Unionist Party politician
 Samuel Chapman (philatelist) (1859–1943), British philatelist who was an expert on Mexican stamps
 Samuel E. Chapman, member of the Wisconsin State Assembly in 1848 and 1861
Samuel Chapman Armstrong (1838–1893), American educator and officer in the Union Army
Sean Chapman (born 1961), British actor
Shane "Choppa" Chapman (born 1978), New Zealand middleweight kickboxer, boxer and martial artist
Simon Chapman (academic) (born 1951), Australian academic
Simon Chapman (author), British children's author
Stanley Chapman (born 1925), British architect, designer, translator and writer
Stepan Chapman (born 1951), American fiction author
Steve Chapman (ice hockey), ice hockey executive
Steven Chapman (cricketer) (born 1971), English cricketer
Steven Curtis Chapman (born 1962), American Christian musician
Stuart Chapman (born 1951), English footballer and football coach
Sydney Chapman (economist) (1871–1951), British economist and civil servant
Sydney Chapman (mathematician) (1888–1970), British astronomer and geophysicist
Sydney Chapman (politician) (born 1935), English Conservative Party politician and architect

T

Ted Chapman (1934–2005), Australian Liberal Party politician
Terry Magaoa Chapman (died 2014), Niuean politician and diplomat
Theodore S. Chapman (1849–1914), American lawyer, businessman, and politician
Thomas Algernon Chapman (1842–1921), British entomologist.
Thomas Chapman (Australian politician) (1815–1884), British premier of Tasmania
Sir Thomas Chapman, 7th Baronet (1846–1919), Anglo-Irish landowner and father of T. E. Lawrence aka Lawrence of Arabia
Thomas Alfred Chapman (1867–1949), British Anglican Bishop
Tim Chapman (born 1965), American bounty hunter
Timothy Granville-Chapman (born 1947), British Vice-Chief of the Defence Staff of the British Armed Forces
Tony Chapman, British musician, early member of The Rolling Stones
Tracy Chapman (born 1964), American singer-songwriter

V 

Vernon Chapman (born 1921), English footballer and football manager
Vickie Chapman (born 1957), Australian Liberal Party politician
Victor Chapman (1890–1916), French-American pilot during World War I
Victor Chapman (racing driver), New Zealand motor-racing driver
Vince Chapman (born 1967), English footballer
Virgil Chapman (1895–1951), American Democratic Party politician

W

Wade Chapman (born 1976), Australian footballer
Wallace Chapman, New Zealand radio and television host
Wayne Chapman (basketball) (born 1945), American basketball player
William Chapman (cricketer), English cricketer
William Chapman (poet), Canadian poet
William W. Chapman (1808–1892), American politician in Iowa and Oregon
William Chapman Hewitson (1806–1878), British naturalist
William Chapman Nyaho (born 1958) Ghanaian-American concert pianist
William Chapman Ralston (1826–1875), American founder of the Bank of California
William Charles Chapman Mortimer, English writer

Y
Yvonne Chapman (born 1940), Australian National Party politician

Fictional characters
Union Jack (Joseph Chapman), in Marvel comics
William "Billy" Chapman, the antagonist of 1984 film Silent Night, Deadly Night
Richard "Ricky" Chapman/Caldwell, brother of Billy and antagonist of later Silent Night, Deadly Night films
 Hedrick Chapman, minor antagonist in the Animorphs novel series
 Melissa Chapman, Hedrick's daughter

References

Occupational surnames
English-language surnames
English-language occupational surnames